The Islamabad Expressway, sometimes Islamabad Highway) is a major north-south expressway in Islamabad, Capital Territory, Pakistan. The expressway provides quick access between Islamabad and Rawalpindi, connecting the national capital with the N-5 National Highway. It stretches from Zero Point Interchange with the Kashmir Highway in Islamabad to Rawat, Islamabad Capital Territory on the N-5 National Highway.

In 2007, the Capital Development Authority proposed to build three new interchanges on the highway at Koral Chowk, Lehtrar Road and Dhok Kala Khan Road to make it signal free. However, expansion work was delayed until 2014. The expansion later included a dedicated bike lane on the highway as well.

Interchanges and exits

See also 
 Jinnah Avenue
 Faizabad Interchange
 Seventh Avenue (Islamabad)
 Developments in Islamabad
 Transport in Islamabad
 Expressways of Pakistan

References

External links 
 Capital Development Authority

Highways in Islamabad Capital Territory
Highways in Punjab